The 2010–11 season was Sydney FC's third season in the W-League, the Australian national women's soccer league.

Fixtures

Regular season

Finals series

Standings

Players

Squad
As of 3 November 2010.

Leading scorers

The leading goal scorers from the regular season.

Squad statistics
Last updated 10 October 2009

Records
First game = 4-2 win away V Brisbane Roar
Largest win = 4-0 away V Adelaide United 
Largest loss = 2-1 home V Newcastle Jets

References

2010-11
2010–11 W-League (Australia) by team